Puritan tiger beetle may refer to:

 Cicindela puritana
 Ellipsoptera puritana

Animal common name disambiguation pages